Percy James Greenway (born 1897 - died 1980) was a British botanist

Authority abbreviation

References

1897 births
1980 deaths